The following article presents a summary of the 1956 football (soccer) season in Brazil, which was the 55th season of competitive football in the country.

Torneio Rio-São Paulo

The Torneio Rio-São Paulo was not contested in 1956.

Campeonato Paulista

Final Stage (Série Azul)

Championship playoff

Santos declared as the Campeonato Paulista champions.

State championship champions

(1)Atlético Mineiro and Cruzeiro shared the Minas Gerais State Championship title.

Other competition champions

Brazil national team
The following table lists all the games played by the Brazil national football team in official competitions and friendly matches during 1956.

References

 Brazilian competitions at RSSSF
 1956 Brazil national team matches at RSSSF

 
Seasons in Brazilian football
Brazil